iTunes Originals – Patti Smith is an iTunes Originals compilation album by Patti Smith, released digitally by iTunes Store on January 8, 2008. It includes interviews, new versions of pre-existing songs, and original songs that have been released before.

Track listing

Personnel 
 Patti Smith – vocals, guitar, clarinet
 Lenny Kaye – guitar
 Richard Sohl – keyboards
 Ivan Kral – bass
 Jay Dee Daugherty – drums
 Bruce Brody – keyboards
 Tony Shanahan – bass, keyboards
 Oliver Ray – guitar

Release history

Notes

External links 
 Press release at PR Newswire

Patti Smith albums
Smith, Patti
2008 live albums
2008 compilation albums